Liangguang (Postal romanization: Liangkwang) is a Chinese term for the province of Guangdong and the former province and present autonomous region of Guangxi, collectively. It particularly refers to the viceroyalty of Liangguang under the Qing dynasty, when the territory was considered to include Hainan and the leased territories of British Hong Kong, the French Kouang-Tchéou-Wan and Portuguese Macau. The Viceroyalty of Liangguang existed from 1735 to 1911.

History 
Liangguang was originally the land of Hundred Yue, part of the territory of Ouyue. In 207 BC, after defeating An Dương Vương, Zhao Tuo annexed Âu Lạc territory into Nanhai District to establish Nanyue.

The area has been considered the southern expanse of China since the creation of Panyu in 226. Prior to that, the area was known as the Nanhai Commandery.

Guangxi autonomy 
In the 1920s and 1930s, the areas of Guangxi dominated by the Zhuang people greatly aided the Communist Party of China in the Chinese Civil War. Soon after the Communist victory in 1949, in 1952 the People's Republic of China created a Zhuang autonomous prefecture in the western half of Guangxi.  However, some scholars of the Zhuang do not believe that this decision came out of genuine grassroots demands from that ethnic group, who made up only 33% of the province's population, which is contradictory to Chinese scholars that the Zhuang people clearly maintain their distinct culture and lifestyle (i.e. language, religion, etc.). Scholars like George Moseley and Diana Lary instead argue that the conversion of Guangxi to a Zhuang autonomous region was designed to foil local sentiment against the Communist Party as well as to smash pan-Lingnan sentiment.  Shortly afterward, many Cantonese in the Guangxi government were replaced by Zhuangs and Guangxi annexed the Nanlu region of Guangdong in 1952, giving the formerly landlocked region access to the sea.  In 1958, the entire province was officially designated the Guangxi Zhuang Autonomous Region.

Hainan separation 
In 1988, Hainan was separated from Guangdong and established as a separate province.

Leased territories

Hong Kong 
Hong Kong was leased to the British Empire in 1841 until the transfer of sovereignty over Hong Kong in 1997, when it was converted into a special administrative region.

Kouang-Tchéou-Wan 
Kouang-Tchéou-Wan, also known as Zhanjiang, was leased to the French Third Republic in 1898 until the end of World War II in 1946.

Macau 
Macau was granted to the Portuguese Empire in 1557 until the transfer of sovereignty over Macau in 1999, when it was converted into a special administrative region.

See also 
 Lingnan

References 

Geography of Guangdong
Geography of Guangxi
Regions of China